van der Neer is a surname. Notable people with the surname include:

Aert van der Neer (1603–1677), Dutch painter
Eglon van der Neer (1643–1703), Dutch painter, son of Aert

See also
Van der Meer

Surnames of Dutch origin